Break the News is the third studio album by Swedish singer Darin. It was released on 22 November 2006 in Sweden. The album reached the top of the Swedish Album Charts. Four singles were released from the album in Sweden with an additional track charting from promotion.

Promotion
In Sweden, Break the News was promoted with two official singles, "Perfect" and "Everything But the Girl". The third single, "Desire",was released as a download only single in May 2007. In Germany, two physical singles were released; "Insanity" in August 2007 and "Desire".

Darin promoted the album with a ten cities tour from 25 November until 16 December 2006. Large billboard posters were placed around Swedish cities Stockholm, Göteborg and Malmö. He also promoted the album in Germany, including performances on Popstars, where he sang "Desire", and on The Dome where he sang "Insanity". In 2007, Darin embarked on The Pure Desire Tour.

Track listing

Notes
 signifies additional producer(s)

Personnel 

Per Aldeheim – producer
B-Martin.se – album photography
Patrik Berger – producer
Rikard Branden – producer
Jörgen Elofsson – producer
Björn Engelmann – mastering
Nicklas Flyckt – mixer
Anders Hansson – producer
Gustav "Grizzly" Jonsson –  mixer, producer
Ronny Lahti – mixer
Malin Lillewarg – album cover design
Peter Mansson – executive producer, mixer, producer

Roberto Martorell – mixer
Eshraque "iSHi" Mughal –  mixer, producer
Ollie Olson – mixer
RedOne – mixer
Patric Sarin – executive producer
Fredrik Thomander – mixer, producer
Tommy Tysper – producer
Anti Wendel – album photography
Pär Westerlund – producer
Anders Wikström –  mixer, producer
Darin Zanyar – vocals

Charts

Certifications

Release history

References 

2006 albums
Darin (singer) albums
RCA Records albums
EMI Records albums